Thalassobacillus cyri is a Gram-positive, moderately halophilic, strictly aerobic, rod-shaped and motil bacterium from the genus of Thalassobacillus which has been isolated from brine from the Howz Soltan Lake in Iran.

References

External links
Type strain of Thalassobacillus cyri at BacDive -  the Bacterial Diversity Metadatabase
 

Bacillaceae
Bacteria described in 2009